Loggerhead Key is an uninhabited tropical island within the Dry Tortugas group of islands in the Gulf of Mexico. At approximately 49 acres (19.8 hectares) in size, it is the largest island of the Dry Tortugas. Despite being uninhabited, the island receives visitors, such as day visitors and campers. The island only has a few built structures, including the Dry Tortugas Light and a lightkeeper's house that was constructed in the 1920s. The island has drinking water derived using desalination technology and solar power. The Carnegie Marine Biological Laboratory operated on Loggerhead Key from 1904 to 1939.

Climate
Loggerhead Key has a tropical savannah climate (Aw). Summers are long, hot and year round. The rainy season lasts from June to October with light rainfall when compared to the rest of Florida. Loggerhead Key is likely the driest place in Florida with the lowest amount of precipitation inches and precipitation days, being far from the Florida mainland where afternoon thunderstorms form with ease over the land.

Etymology
Loggerhead Key is named after the loggerhead sea turtle, an endangered marine reptile and species of sea turtle with a cosmopolitan distribution throughout the world.

Coral reefs
The Little Africa coral reef is located at Loggerhead Key. The reef is home to various species of tropical fish, spiny lobster and several juvenile game fish. Coral types include "various species of stony and gorgonian coral".

Flora and fauna
The flora of Loggerhead Key includes mangrove, coconut palms, geiger trees, morning glory, sea lavender and cactus. In the 1840s, the island was covered with white buttonwood trees, which were burned or cut down by island inhabitants. Bay cedar existed on the island in the early 1900s.

Fauna of Loggerhead Key includes sea turtles, which are monitored by park rangers with the Dry Tortugas National Park to document nesting and hatching rates. The loggerhead sea turtle is also present on the island. In August 2016, a National Park marine biologist stated that 113 loggerhead turtle nests existed on the island at that time. This was the highest recorded nest rate compared previous years.

The island also has brown pelicans.

Former rhesus macaque habitat
In 1972, hundreds of rhesus macaque monkeys were brought from India to Loggerhead Key by Charles River Laboratories. This was done to provide the monkeys a place to breed, to supply the animals for medical research laboratory experiments. Around 1,322 of the monkeys existed on the island between 1987 and 1990.

Dry Tortugas Light

The Dry Tortugas Light is a lighthouse located on Loggerhead Key. It began operations in 1858 and was decommissioned in 2014.

Carnegie Marine Biological Laboratory
The Carnegie Marine Biological Laboratory, also referred to as the Tortugas Laboratory, was a marine biology laboratory and research facility constructed on the northern end of Loggerhead Key that operated from 1904 to 1939. It was constructed and operated by the Carnegie Institution of Washington. The Carnegie Marine Biological Laboratory performed some of the first research on Western hemisphere mangroves and coral reefs, marine life at the Loggerhead Key coral reefs, other marine life, and also performed  underwater color and black-and-white photography there. Due to safety concerns regarding the hurricane season, research only occurred in the late spring and summer months.

References

External links
 
 Loggerhead Key. National Park Service.

Islands of Monroe County, Florida
Islands of the Florida Keys
Gulf of Mexico
Islands of Florida